Papercutting or paper cutting is the art of paper designs. Art has evolved all over the world to adapt to different cultural styles. One traditional distinction most styles share is that the designs are cut from a single sheet of paper as opposed to multiple adjoining sheets as in collage.

History

Paper cut art appeared during the Han dynasty in 4th century AD after the Chinese official, Cai Lun invented paper in 105 AD. The oldest surviving paper cut out is a symmetrical circle from the 6th-century Six Dynasties period found in Xinjiang China. Papercutting continued to be practiced during the Song and Tang dynasties as a popular form of decorative art.

By the eighth or ninth century papercutting appeared in West Asia and in Turkey in the 16th century. The knowledge of papermaking did not reach Europe until the 13th century so papercutting could only have arrived after that. In Switzerland and Germany for example it was not until the 16th century that papercut art or scherenschnitte was established (see also silhouette).

Chinese

Jianzhi (剪紙) is a traditional style of papercutting in China, and it originated from cutting patterns for rich Chinese embroideries and later developed into a folk art in itself. Jianzhi has been practised in China since at least the 6th century AD. Jianzhi has a number of distinct uses in Chinese culture, almost all of which are for health, prosperity or decorative purposes. Red is the most commonly used colour. Jianzhi cuttings often have a heavy emphasis on Chinese characters symbolizing the Chinese zodiac animals. It is included in the UNESCO Intangible Cultural Heritage Lists, which was created in 2009. The Chinese papercutting was recognized and listed because it has a history of more than 1500 years, and it represents cultural values of the people throughout China. In China, there is also the movie Songs of War which was made with a particular style of animation on the app called Blender.

Modern paper cutting has developed into a commercial industry. Papercutting remains popular in contemporary China, especially during special events like the Chinese New Year or weddings.

Japanese
Japanese paper cutting is called kirie or kirigami (literally meaning cut picture). It is said to have developed after 610 AD when tesuki washi paper, invented in China, was brought to Japan by Doncho, a Buddhist monk from Korea. The Japanese commercialised paper making by hand, and by 800 AD their skills were unrivalled. The abundance of Japanese washi meant paper cutting and offshoots such as kamikiri (performance papercutting in Edo Japan) developed at a very fast pace.

The washi paper used most predominantly across the world today for paper cutting, bookbinding, tapes and multiple other uses is not tesuki washi but actually Japanese Sekishu washi, a paper developed around 800 AD in the Sekishu region (modern-day Iwami in Japan) and designated a UNESCO Intangible Cultural asset in 2009. Paper cutting continues today in Japan in contemporary forms such as framed art, installations and paper cut sculpture.

Indonesian
Indonesian traditional art has been influenced by traditional Chinese artisans. Batik is an Indonesian traditional art and paper cutting. Batik is framed in profile to expose the intricate detail of batik.

Filipino
Several Philippine crafts employ paper cutting. During Filipino Christmas, the parol (a traditional star-shaped lantern) is embellished with coloured paper cut into various forms such as floral designs on the faces, pom-pons and "tails" on the points of the star.

There is also the art of pabalát (wrapper), where coloured paper is meticulously cut with small scissors and used to sheathe pastillas de leche (carabao milk candy) and other traditional sweets. Paper cutting is also involved in the creation of banderitas (bunting) that feature prominently in fiesta décor; these may be elaborate or plain-cut paper squares and triangles strung over streets.

Jewish

Papercutting has been a common Jewish art form since the Middle Ages, connected with various customs and ceremonies, and associated with holidays and family life. Paper cuts often decorated ketubot (marriage contracts), mizrahs, and for ornaments on festive occasions. A story tells of Rabbi Shem-Tov ben Yitzhak ben Ardutiel, finding that his ink had frozen, continued to write the manuscript by cutting the letters into the paper. By about the 17th century, papercutting had become a popular form for small religious artifacts such as mizrachs and Shavuot decorations. In the 20th century, the art of Jewish papercutting was revived in Israel. Today it is most commonly used for mizrachs and ketubot.

Mexican
Papel picado is the Mexican art of paper cutting. Tissue paper is cut into intricate designs with scissors or small, sharp chisels; this technique is frequently used to produce decorative banners.

Slavic
The beautiful Slavic version of the art form of papercutting, popular in Belarus, Poland, and Ukraine, is called Wycinanki ([vɨt͡ɕiˈnaŋkʲi]) in Poland or Vytynanky (Витина́нки) in Ukraine or Vycinanki (Выцінанкі) in Belarus. Roosters, flowers, and holiday motifs are frequently the subject matter of these bright and multilayered artworks.

Swedish
Christmas is when flowers of cut and manipulated paper, fringed candy holders called crackers, and ljuskrona which are covered with cut paper, are found in Swedish and Swedish-American homes.

Switzerland 

There is a Swiss tradition of papercutting, especially in the Pays-d'Enhaut.

Other
Silhouette can refer to the art of cutting outlines or portraits out of black paper. Modern-day papercutters typically follow one or more of the "traditional" styles listed above, while others have begun to expand the art into new styles, motifs, and designs. Contemporary papercutting is also sometimes associated with the art of stenciling, itself being derived from techniques used in graffiti art. The use of hand-cut stencils in graffiti art has received international attention in recent years due in part to the artist Banksy.

Notable papercut artists 
 Joanna Koerten (1650–1715) Dutch silhouette artist
 Adele Schopenhauer (1797–1849), German author, artist, and sister of the philosopher Arthur Schopenhauer
 Hans Christian Andersen (1805–1875), Danish story-teller, author, and papercut artist
 Henri Matisse (1869–1954), French painter, who explored paper-cut illustration and decoupage
Jan Pieńkowski (1936–2022) Polish illustrator, writer and designer of children's books using silhouettes.
 Lotte Reiniger (1899–1981), German silhouette animation filmmaker
 Jeanette Kuvin Oren (born 1961), American papercut artist
 Kara Walker (born 1969), contemporary African American artist
 Lane Twitchell (born 1967), contemporary American Landscape artist
 Nahoko Kojima (born 1981), contemporary Japanese papercut art, who creates sculptural, hanging papercuts
 Nikki McClure, American papercut artist
 William Schaff (born 1973), American papercut artist; his work in cover of the album cover "I am Very Far" by Okkervil River.
 Rob Ryan, British papercut and serigraph artist
 Barbara Earl Thomas (b. 1948), American visual artist, writer, and arts administrator based in Seattle.
 Tusif Ahmad, Australian Islamic papercut artist
 Beatriz Vasquez, Mexican-American traditional and neo-Papel Picado artist (born 1969)

See also

 Chad (paper), left over fragments from cutting.
 Chinese paper folding
 Chinese paper cutting
 Leaf carving
 Scherenschnitte
 Silhouette
 Stencil
 Vytynanky (Wycinanki)
 Origami
 Kirigami

References

Folk art
Paper art